Dominik Szulc (June 10, 1787 – December 27, 1860) was a Polish philosopher, historian, and a significant precursor to Polish positivism.

In 1814 he began studies at the University of Vilnius. In 1818 became a teacher of Polish language in high school in Vilnius, and from 1823 a teacher of eloquence and logic in the gymnasium of Bialystok . From 1835 he taught at the gymnasium of Lublin, since 1840 in schools in Warsaw. In 1853 he retired. A member of the Kraków Scientific Society correspondence, and the Russian Geographical Society. In his works he defended the thesis of the Polish character of Copernicus. He believed that the discoveries of Copernicus began the development of modern civilization and science.

External links
Domink's essay

19th-century Polish philosophers
19th-century Polish historians
Polish male non-fiction writers
1860 deaths
1787 births
Vilnius University alumni